Events in the year 1798 in India.

Incumbents
 Sir Alured Clarke, Governor-General, 1798 
 Marquess Wellesley, Governor-General, 1798–1805.

Events
 National income - 11,131 million
 The Fourth Anglo-Mysore War begins.

Births
10 November – Charles Phillip Brown, writer and colonial official (died 1884).

References

 
Years of the 18th century in India